The Sichuan Symphony Orchestra (Chinese: 四川 交响乐团; pinyin: Sichuan Jiāoxiǎng Yuètuán; abbreviated SSO) was established in 2002. The average age of musicians in SSO  is 30, making it the youngest symphony orchestra in mid-western China. The performance schedule of the orchestra is the most vigorous. The Orchestra expanding to 140 Musicians.

The orchestra's former executive director and principal conductor was Mr. Tang Qingshi 唐青石先生. The current music director is Darrell Ang.

In the past years, SSO has been honoured to collaborate with the following celebrated musicians to perform in various concerts well received by the audience:

 Hu Kun (Chinese: 胡坤 先生) Chinese violinist and conductor
 Plácido Domingo Spanish tenor / baritone
 Song Zuying (Chinese: 宋祖英女士; pinyin: Sòng Zǔyīng), an ethnic Miao Chinese singer.
 Virginia Tola, Argentinian soprano .

References

Audio / Video links
Audio CD 1: Handel Concerto grosso X Op. 6, No.10
Audio CD 2: Bizet Carmen Suite No.1
 Video 1: Zhang Yiquan Compositions - Prelude 张贻泉音乐作品发布会序
Video 2: Zhang Yiquan Compositions - Tai Luge Ballet Ensemble  张贻泉音乐作品 - 太鲁阁芭蕾舞曲
Video 3: Zhang Yiquan Compositions - Remorse in Lin An 张贻泉音乐作品发布会 - 临安遗恨 
Video 4: Zhang Yiquan Compositions - Overlooking the grandiose landscape of the Qin Dynasty 张贻泉音乐作品发布会 - 望秦川

Other External links
Sichuan Symphony Orchestra official site (in Chinese)
Musical Programme of the Past Concert Series, Sichuan Symphony Orchestra
List of Symphony Orchestras in Greater China -PRC. HKSAR. Macao SAR and Taiwan

China orchestras
Musical groups established in 2002
2002 establishments in China